The 2016–17 Guinée Championnat National season is the top level of football competition in Guinea. It began on 16 December 2016 and concluded on 8 June 2017.

Standings

References

Guinée Championnat National
Championnat National
Championnat National
2016–17 in African association football leagues